Kilbarrack ( - Church of St. Berach or of young Barra) is a residential suburb of Dublin, Ireland, running inwards from the coast, about  from the city's centre. It is also a civil parish in the ancient barony of Coolock. Modern-day Kilbarrack is within the jurisdiction of Dublin City Council, with part of its old lands now in Donaghmede, and part in Bayside under Fingal County Council jurisdiction.

Location and access
Kilbarrack is situated on the Northside of the city, between the suburbs of Raheny, Donaghmede and Bayside (the latter was formed from Kilbarrack's old core).  It originally bordered Sutton, Dublin also, and the coastal part may still do so.  Its coastal area faces North Bull Island across the water known as Raheny Lake or Crab Water.

Kilbarrack is accessible from the coast road and the Tonlegee Road, by its own station on the (DART) Dublin Area Rapid Transit suburban rail system (as well as from Raheny and Howth Junction stations), and by bus routes 17A to Blanchardstown, 31/A/B to Howth and the city centre and 32, from the city centre to Malahide and Portmarnock. Kilbarrack railway station opened on 1 June 1969.

History and nature

Kilbarrack is an old district, whose name can be found on maps and sea charts, many held at Dublin City Archive, going back several hundred years. It was historically a large area of fields, many being 'grange' lands held by Dublin church establishments, with small settlements. Over time, two hamlets emerged, Kilbarrack proper, near the seafront, close to the still-extant Kilbarrack Church and Graveyard complex (illustrated below), and Little Kilbarrack, on the road inland (now Tonlegee Road).

The district is crossed by one of Dublin's small waterways, the Kilbarrack Stream or Donough Water, which enters the sea in two branches.

The coastal church ("mapped as Kilbarrack Church, in ruins") and surrounding graveyard were a point of call for mariners, and the church is noted in some records as the Chapel of Mone. At one time, ships entering Dublin Bay paid monies to the city authorities towards the upkeep of the chapel.  The cemetery, which still accepts burials in existing graves, includes the grave of the "Sham Squire."

The site of Kilbarrack hamlet, and the part of the district bounding Sutton and Baldoyle, are now together known as Bayside (from inside Kilbarrack Road to Baldoyle Road), while today's Kilbarrack, and the Greendale shopping and civic complex, are close to where Little Kilbarrack stood. The Tesco-led shopping centre is near the site of the former "big house" of the area, Kilbarrack House.

In the 1970s, Swans Nest Court, a complex of tower blocks of flats was built by Dublin Corporation. It was demolished and redeveloped into social and affordable housing in the early 2000s after it fell into disrepair.

Amenities

Kilbarrack has a local office of Dublin City Council, two shopping precincts (Greendale, with a large Centra, and Kilbarrack, dominated by Tesco, which has renovated it twice over the last decade) and a range of shops and pubs. There is a major Health Services Executive centre, and, at the boundary with Raheny and Donaghmede, and a municipal fire station and practice yard.

Kilbarrack has five primary schools, three in one grouping: Scoil Eoin, the Educate Together North Bay School and Gaelscoil Mide, previously of Donaghmede, and two in another group: St. Benedict's and St. Mary's, located beside St. Benedict's parish church.

Kilbarrack is also well known for its sporting clubs and teams, which include Bay City Boxing Club, Naomh Barrog GAA Club (https://web.archive.org/web/20120313202639/http://www.naomhbarrog.ie/), Kilbarrack United FC (http://www.kilbarrackunited.com), who play intermediate football in the Leinster Senior League (LSL) after previously being in Premier A of the AUL, and Kilmount Boys FC who were Amateur Football League champions 2006-07.

The modern Parish Church (Roman Catholic) serves Kilbarrack and part of Raheny (Parish of Kilbarrack-Foxfield); some locals attend St. Benedict's Church in Grange Park Parish, which also serves some in Raheny.

People
 Author, Booker Prize winner and former teacher at Greendale Community School in Kilbarrack, Roddy Doyle, is seen by many as having captured the atmosphere and spirit of Kilbarrack, thinly disguised as Barrytown, in a series of popular fiction works.
 Several-times Irish minister Michael Woods lives on Kilbarrack Road near where the district meets Bayside.
Andrew Maxwell, stand-up comedian.
Malachy Quinn Former Fingal County Councillor

In popular culture
The 1996 film The Van, part of Roddy Doyle's Barrytown trilogy, was filmed in Kilbarrack.

See also
List of towns and villages in Ireland

References

External links
Radio Documentary about the St. Benedict's Multimedia Group in Kilbarrack Radio Documentary from Near90fm

 
Towns and villages in Dublin (city)